Enric Prat de la Riba i Sarrà (29 November 1870 – 1 August 1917) was a Catalan politician, lawyer and writer. He became the first President of the Commonwealth of Catalonia on 6 April 1914 and retained this office until his death. He wrote the book and political manifesto La nacionalitat catalana in which greater autonomy to Catalonia was advocated. He died in 1917 and is interred in the Montjuïc Cemetery in Barcelona.

Early life
Enric Prat de la Riba i Sarrà was born on 29 November 1870 in Castellterçol, to an affluent Roman Catholic conservative family. He started his law studies at the University of Barcelona and finished and received his degree at the Central University of Madrid.

Political career
Prat de la Riba was attracted towards Catalan nationalism when he was still in college. In 1887, he became a member of Centre Escolar Catalanista. He became an important member of the cultural and political organization , in which he wrote some of its most relevant manifestos, among them is the famous  in 1897. In 1891, he was elected the secretary of Unió. He penned Catalan nationalist writings such as Compendi de la doctrina catalanista and Compendi de la història de Catalunya. He also wrote for the periodical . The Regionalist League was a right-wing Catalan political party established in 1901 by Prat de la Riba. The party demanded greater administrative autonomy to Catalonia.

He is also known as the author of the Noucentista Catalan nationalist manifesto La nacionalitat catalana in 1906.

Later on, in 1907 he became the first president of the Institut d'Estudis Catalans, president of the Diputació de Barcelona and a proponent of the Commonwealth of Catalonia, which he led until his death on 6 April 1914, having served as its first President of the Commonwealth.

References

External links

 Biography of Prat de la Riba on Gran Enciclopèdia Catalana (Great Catalan Encyclopaedia)

1870 births
1917 deaths
People from Vallès Oriental
Politicians from Catalonia